Maine School Administrative District 28 (Camden Rockport Schools) is a K-8 school district headquartered in Camden, Maine, serving both Camden and Rockport. It operates Camden Rockport Elementary School (CRES) and Camden Rockport Middle School (CRMS).

It feeds into Camden Hills Regional High School of the Five Town Community School District.

References

External links
 

28
Camden, Maine
Education in Knox County, Maine
Rockport, Maine